is a 2022 Japanese television series starring Kento Yamazaki, Yukino Kishii, and Kouhei Matsushita. The original screenplay was written by Marie Kamimori. It is a drama about the video game industry.

In Japan, the show is called Children of Atom and aired on Sundays on TBS from October 2022 to December 2022. Afterward, it was made available for streaming on Disney+ in certain countries.

Synopsis
Umi Tominaga (Yukino Kishii) is the third generation owner of toy company Atom's Toys. To save her family's failing business, she sets out to find John Doe, the developer of a popular indie video game, to recruit as a video game developer. John Doe turns out to be the pseudonym of Nayuta Azumi (Kento Yamazaki) and Hayato Sugo. Nayuta, Hayato, and Koya Ogata were friends who used to make video games together but stopped six years ago when Koya committed suicide after getting their video game idea stolen by a large corporation known as SAGAS. John Doe reunite and work to create a game for Atom's Toys while SAGAS actively tries to undermine their gaming development so they can take over the company and acquire the license to use their gaming technology.

Cast

Main characters
 Kento Yamazaki as Nayuta Azumi
 Yukino Kishii as Umi Tominaga 
 Kouhei Matsushita as Hayato Sugo 
 Joe Odagiri as Akihiku Okitsu

Supporting characters
 Morio Kazama as Shigeo Tominaga
 Denden as Kengo Yaegashi
 Muga Tsukaji as Eiji Kagami
 Hyunri as Aki Sagara

References

External links
 Official website
 

2022 Japanese television series debuts
Japanese drama television series